Kalyanpur  Assembly constituency is an assembly constituency in Samastipur district in the Indian state of Bihar. The seat is reserved for scheduled castes.

Overview
As per Delimitation of Parliamentary and Assembly constituencies Order, 2008, No. 131 Kalyanpur Assembly constituency is composed of the following: Kalyanpur and Pusa community development blocks.

Kalyanpur Assembly constituency (SC) is part of No. 23 Samastipur (Lok Sabha constituency).

Election results

2020

1977-2015
In the 2015 state assembly elections, Maheshwar Hazari of JD(U) won the Kalyanpur assembly seat by one of the highest margin of 52,000 defeating his rival Prince Raj of Lok Janshakti Party.

In the 2010 state assembly elections, Ramsewak Hazari Paswan of JD(U) won the Kalyanpur assembly seat defeating his nearest rival Bishwanathan Paswan of LJP. In the 2009 bye-elections Ashok Prasad Verma  of RJD won from Kushwaha caste. Contests in most years were multi cornered but only winners and runners up are being mentioned.  In October 2005, Ashwamedh Devi  of JD(U) defeated Ashok Prasad Verma  of RJD, despite both from Kushwaha caste. Ashok Prasad Verma  of RJD defeated Ashwamedh Devi  of JD(U) in February 2005. Ashwamedh Devi  of Samata Party defeated Alok Kumar Mehta of RJD in 2000, later he became a Member of Parliament . Sita Sinha of Janata Dal defeated Pradeep Mahto of Samta Party in 1995. Dilip Kumar Rai of Congress defeated Bashistha Narain Singh of Janata Dal in 1990. Bashistha Narain Singh of Lok Dal defeated Ram Sukumari Devi of Congress in 1985. Ram Sukumari Devi of Congress (I) defeated Bashistha Narain Singh of Janata Party (S) in 1980. Bashisht Narain Singh of Janata Party defeated Ram Naresh Trivedi (Congress) in 1977. Brahmdeo Narayan Singh of Samyukta Socialist Party defeated Ram Naresh Trivedi (Congress) in 1966.

References

External links
 

Assembly constituencies of Bihar
Politics of Samastipur district